Vathy is a small seaside village in Sifnos, Greece. According to the 2011 census it had a population of 40 permanent residents. It is located on the southwest coast of the island facing the neighboring island of Kimolos.

Vathy belongs to the community of Apollonia of the municipality of Sifnos, which in turn belongs to Milos regional unit of the South Aegean administrative unit.

References 
Villages in Greece
Populated places in Milos (regional unit)